The 1985 Dunhill Cup was the first Dunhill Cup. It was a team tournament featuring 16 countries, each represented by three players. The Cup was played 17–20 October at the Old Course at St Andrews in Scotland. The sponsor was the Alfred Dunhill company. The Australian team of David Graham, Graham Marsh, and Greg Norman beat the American team of Raymond Floyd, Mark O'Meara, and Curtis Strange in the final.

Format
The Cup was played as a single-elimination, match play event played over four days. The top eight teams were seeded with the remaining teams randomly placed in the bracket. In each match, the three players were paired with their opponents and played 18 holes at medal match play. Tied matches were extended to a sudden-death playoff only if they affected the outcome between the two teams.

Bracket

Round by round scores

First round
Source:

Quarter-finals
Source:

Semi-finals
Source:

Final
Source:

Third place
Source:

Team results

Player results

References

Alfred Dunhill Cup
Dunhill Cup
Dunhill Cup
Dunhill Cup